Silarus was the Latin name of two Italian rivers:
Silarus (Sele), today the Sele in Campania
Silarus (Sillaro), today the Sillaro, in Emilia-Romagna